Patriarch Stephen I may refer to:

 Patriarch Stephen I of Antioch, ruled in 341–345 or in 342–344
 Stephen I of Constantinople, Ecumenical Patriarch of Constantinople in 886–893